Raincoat is a 2004 Indian drama film directed by Rituparno Ghosh, and starring Ajay Devgn and Aishwarya Rai. It tells the story of two lovers, separated by destiny, who meet again one day. This encounter allows each to realize the truth about the lives they are living. It is an adaptation of short story Protihingsha by Manoj Basu

The shooting for the film was completed only in 16 days. The film won the National Film Award for Best Feature Film in Hindi and Aishwarya Rai was nominated for the Filmfare Award for Best Actress.

Plot 
Manoj (Ajay Devgan) is a country man with very little money who lives in Bhagalpur, and is sent to Calcutta by his mother to look for money for his sister's wedding. While there, he stays with two friends, Alok and Sheela (Mouli Ganguly), who are very helpful in his desperate quest to find money. Alok makes some phone calls and writes a letter for him to send to his former classmates. The letter explains Manoj's plight, and asks for any money to spare. Manoj, ashamed, tells Alok to forget the letter and that he will go out the next day and ask for money personally.

The next morning, Alok tells about his career. He has gotten quite wealthy as a producer for TV serials. Also, as a part of a diet, he has Herbalife for breakfast. Manoj asks Alok about an address that he plans to stop at while looking for money that day, and the address turns out to be of a woman that Manoj was supposed to marry, but married another. Alok remembers what he had to go through to get Manoj over her, and insists he not go there and upset himself. Sheela tells Alok not to get so angry, and let Manoj go where he pleases. The woman is supposed to be quite wealthy, and Manoj hopes not only to see her again (for the first time since her marriage), but perhaps to get some money as well. Alok finally backs off.

To prepare Manoj for his journey out in the pouring rain, Alok gives him an address book of the people he may be able to collect money from, while Sheela gives Manoj a mobile phone, teaches him to use it, and a raincoat to keep him dry. On his journey, Manoj manages to collect 12,000 rupees before stopping at the home of his lost love, Neerja (Aishwarya Rai). Being there, he gets a memory of being a doorstep before, when they were together and happy, but is interrupted by Neerja's voice. She doesn't believe it is really him at first, and takes quite a while to open the door. When she does, she tells him that she fell asleep, and warmly invites him to stay and sit until the rain stops. There is no one home. Neerja's husband is away, and the servants are out playing cards.

While sitting, she tells him that he has changed. His hair is missing, he's gotten dark and lost weight. He asks for her to switch on a light so he can see her better, because she does not look well, and she leaves, but forbids him to follow her in the rest of the house. She brings the light, and shows her face, free of bruises or black eyes, and assures him that her husband really loves her. He asks her why she wears such an expensive sari around the house, and she says it would just sit there otherwise, since she never leaves the house. Neerja is very paranoid. She never opens the door for fear of burglars in her dangerous town coming to invade her wealthy home. She says her husband is away to Japan on business and offered her to come, but refused because of a fear of being locked in a bathroom and not knowing English. Manoj laughs and tells her she hasn't changed a bit.

The doorbell soon rings and Manoj insists on answering it. Neerja gets very afraid and urges him to let it be because she doesn't want to be seen home alone with another man while her husband is away and for word to get to him. He starts to answer the door anyway and she gets very upset, so he sits down. Manoj has a flashback of him getting very sick when he hears of Neerja's marriage. He was still very much in love with her at the time.

Later, Neerja asks what Manoj does for a living and he says that he produces serials. In fact, he is the owner of the company. He tells her that he and his mother live in a two-story apartment and that she should visit some time. Of course, this is far from true, he has a flashback of him bringing his mother a portable toilet, just so she won't have to walk far to use it. Neerja asks if he is married, and he hints that his mother has a girl set up. Neerja doesn't seem pleased.

Another flashback reveals that, although very sick from a fever, Manoj had an outburst about Neerja's engagement, demanding it be broken off. He tells her that he can support her, he'll find a way. Back in the present, Sheela calls him on his mobile to see how he is and if he has eaten. When Neerja asks who it was he says that it his is secretary. Neerja asks about her looks and her knowledge, and when Manoj tells her she's pretty and fluent in English she becomes jealous. She accuses him of flirting when she asked if he has eaten, then realizes she has neglected to feed him. He says that there's no need and he takes Herbalife, but she insists on going out to get him food, for the food in the house she doesn't think he'll like. She tells him to answer the door for no one, takes his raincoat and leaves.

While she is gone, he has a flashback of her engagement, and him begging her one last time not to marry, and to stay with him. It is interrupted by a man at the window, begging to be let in to use the bathroom. Manoj reluctantly lets him in, but after he uses it he refuses to leave. Suspicious, Manoj confronts him and he reveals that he is the landlord. The landlord mistakes Manoj to be a renter of the space, and Manoj asks him why a couple so rich would need to rent. The landlord then reveals that Neerja and her husband are not rich at all. In fact, they are close to being evicted from their home for lack of paying rent. The landlord even shows Manoj the bathroom, which he was refused access to, and sees how empty and dirty it is...like the bathroom of a very poor family. He is confused, for he remembers when Neerja got married, the wedding was very expensive and her husband has an very nice job. The landlord reveals the he lost it in a scam, and has been a conman ever since, scamming others for money, the reason he is not home. And the reason Neerja never opens the door is for fear of bill-collectors and those who want to throw them out of their home. Very alarmed, Manoj gives the landlord the 12,000 rupees he had collected to pay three months' rent and makes the man promise not to throw her out immediately. And to call him if he ever does reach such a decision. The landlord leaves.

Manoj writes her a letter telling her that he now knows the truth and what he has done to help her. He also says that had they been married, he would have done so anyway. He puts the letter under a sofa cover. Neerja returns and says that the shopkeeper was sleeping and she had to wake him up, which is why she took so long. He eats the food she brought and continues to lie about his profession and lifestyle while she grows upset. She says that she feels trapped in the house and that she wants to go far away, even if she gets stuck in the airplane bathroom. Manoj says that even if that were to happen, someone like him would be there to let her out. She doesn't want to be given false hope and starts to cry. He comforts her and she sits down and continues to ask about his business. She also tells him that they are going to be moving into a bigger house and that he should come to visit when he returns. He eventually asks to wash his hands after eating and, once again, she refuses him to see the rest of the house and goes to get him a finger bowl. He rinses off his hands and wipes them on the sofa cover, which Neerja scolds him for. He apologizes and he tells her to have it washed.

Manoj returns to Alok and Sheela, and Alok is quite upset to hear that Manoj managed to lose all of the money he collected, but Sheela calms him down. Before Manoj goes to sleep that night, Sheela comes into his room to give him a letter she said she found in the pocket of the raincoat. In the envelope are golden bangles along with a letter. Confused, Manoj reads the letter which is from Neerja, saying that she is glad he let her borrow the raincoat that day, because she found the letter in the pocket of it, the letter begging his friends for the money he came to Calcutta for. She scolds him for not telling her his troubles, but tells him that she's giving him her jewelry to help him out. She says that if they had gotten married instead, he never would have refused to take her jewelry.

Cast
Ajay Devgn as Manoj "Mannu" Tripathi
Aishwarya Rai as Neerja "Neeru"
Surekha Sikri as Mrs. Tripathi, Mannu's mother
Annu Kapoor as Landlord
Sameer Dharmadhikari as Alok
Mauli Ganguly  Sheila 
Gulzar as poet (voice)

Soundtrack
Debajyoti Mishra experimented with the music of the film. The songs are all background numbers. Famous classical singer Shubha Mudgal lends her voice for the title track. Songs are listed below.

The song "Piya Tora Kaisa Abhimaan" is sung by Raghav Chattopadhya and not by Hariharan. Hariharan had recorded this song for the film but the picturisation of this song is by Raghav Chattopadhya.

Critical response
The Times Of India gave a three stars out of five. Rediff cited "Some films attempt to showcase a series of wonderful moments and tend to go overboard. Raincoat captures just one poignant moment and tells it as simply it can, leaving you with a wow. For someone heralded as the most beautiful woman in the world, Aishwarya Rai looks terrifyingly depressing in the film. Her Neeru looks cynical to the point of suicide.  And that's a compliment. Her body language is a strange mix of a passive housewife and a passionate girlfriend. Though the effort to sound rustic shows, the restraint in her dialogue delivery and performance is commendable. Hesitation, desperation, humiliation -- Ajay Devgan conveys them eloquently. He particularly stands out in the scenes where he cries in the bathroom, or begs Neeru not to marry someone else".

The Hindu stated "Raincoat... essentially a chamber piece, it weaves a narrative with just two characters in most of the frames. Raincoat can easily be Aishwarya Rai's best performance, and as Neerja, the former beauty queen appears to have shed her inhibitions about looking unglamorous. In fact, most of time, Rai looks quite plain. What is more, she seems to have made an earnest effort to emote, using less of her body and limbs and more of her face, and eyes in particular. Ajay Devagan as Manoj is Devagan, as we have seen him in an umpteen number of parts earlier, although Ghosh draws the actor out of a certain woodenness that he is known for".

Taran Adarsh of Bollywood Hungama said "On the whole, Raincoat will appeal to a handful of critics and connoisseurs of art house cinema who'll heap lavish praises/lustrous words, but from the box-office point of view, Raincoat will face stormy weather at the ticket window".

Derek Elley from Variety (magazine) described it as "Raincoat is a chamber-sized gem. Melancholic, rainy afternoon drama, almost entirely set in a single house, features meaty roles for two of Indian cinema's biggest stars, Aishwarya Rai and Ajay Devgan, in very different guises from their usual Bollywood ones. Though pic is unlikely to score big locally when it goes out in August against more commercial heavy-hitters like Swades and The Rising, Raincoat could build a solid rep at fests, with some pickups by specialized webs and niche distribs. As in Ghosh's previous pic, "Chokher Bali: A Passion Play" (2003), Rai reveals herself as a considerable actress given the right script and direction, far from the comic-romantic roles in most of her Bollywood productions. Shunning her usual immaculate makeup and duds, and looking more like a broken, malfunctioning doll, she makes Niru a mixture of child and temptress/charmer, driven by capricious moods and clearly unhappy inside. It's the showier of the two perfs, but Devgan, in ultra low-key mode, is equally impressive, especially in the latter stages as his great love for the woman he once knew reveals itself in an act of charity".

Box office
Raincoat grossed 48.76 million worldwide. The film was a commercial failure at the box office.

Accolades

References

External links

2004 films
2000s Hindi-language films
2004 romantic drama films
Films set in Kolkata
Films based on short fiction
Adaptations of works by O. Henry
Indian romantic drama films
Films directed by Rituparno Ghosh
Best Hindi Feature Film National Film Award winners